is a Japanese politician of the Democratic Party of Japan, a member of the House of Councillors in the Diet (national legislature).

Overview 
A native of Nabari, Mie and graduate of Kogakkan University, he was elected to the House of Councillors for the first time in 2004 after serving the assembly of Mie Prefecture for three terms.

References

External links 
 Official website in Japanese.

Members of the House of Councillors (Japan)
Living people
1950 births
Democratic Party of Japan politicians